The 2020 U-20 Copa CONMEBOL Libertadores was the 5th edition of the U-20 CONMEBOL Libertadores (also referred to as the U-20 Copa Libertadores), South America's premier under-20 club football tournament organized by CONMEBOL. The tournament was held in Paraguay from 15 February to 1 March 2020. Nacional were the defending champions, but failed to advance out of the group stage.

Independiente del Valle defeated River Plate in the final to claim their first title, while Flamengo beat Libertad to finish third.

Teams
The competition was contested by 12 teams: the title holders, the youth champions from each of the ten CONMEBOL member associations, and one additional team from the host association.

Players must be born on or after 1 January 2000.

Venues
The tournament was played at two venues in two cities, both in the Metropolitan Area of Asunción:
Estadio Arsenio Erico, Asunción (home stadium of Club Nacional)
Estadio General Adrián Jara, Luque (home stadium of General Díaz)

Draw
The draw was held on 28 January 2020, 12:00 PYST (UTC−3), at the headquarters of the Paraguayan Football Association. The draw was conducted according to Regulations Article 16 as follows:
The 12 teams were seeded into four pots of three teams, based on the final placement of their national association's club in the previous edition of the tournament, and drawn into three groups of four.
The defending champions Nacional were automatically seeded into Pot 1 and allocated to position A1 in the group stage, while the teams from the next two best associations (Ecuador and Uruguay), were also seeded into Pot 1 and drawn to position B1 or C1 in the group stage.
The teams from the next three associations (Brazil, Argentina and Paraguay) were seeded into Pot 2 and drawn to position A2, B2 or C2 in the group stage.
The teams from the next three associations (Colombia, Venezuela and Chile) were seeded into Pot 3 and drawn to position A3, B3 or C3 in the group stage.
The teams from the last two associations (Bolivia and Peru) and the additional team from the host association (Paraguay) were seeded into Pot 4 and drawn to position A4, B4 or C4 in the group stage.
Teams from the same association could not be drawn into the same group.

Notes

Match officials
On 30 January 2020, CONMEBOL announced that the CONMEBOL Referee Commission had appointed 10 referees and 20 assistant referees for the tournament.

 Andrés Merlos
Assistants: Lucas Germanotta and Facundo Rodríguez
 Jordy Alemán
Assistants: Roger Orellana and Carlos Tapia
 Rafael Traci
Assistants: Bruno Boschilia and Rafael da Silva Alves 
 Felipe González
Assistants: Raúl Orellana and José Retamal
 Bismarks Santiago and Carlos Betancur
Assistants: Wilmar Navarro and Jhon Gallego

 Roberto Sánchez
Assistants: Juan Aguiar and Andrés Tola
 Derlis López
Assistants: Roberto Cañete and José Cuevas
 Miguel Santiváñez
Assistants: Víctor Ráez and Stephen Atoche
 Christian Ferreyra
Assistants: Agustín Berisso and Santiago Fernández
 Orlando Bracamonte
Assistants: Alberto Ponte and Franchezcoly Chacón

Group stage
In the group stage, the teams were ranked according to points (3 points for a win, 1 point for a draw, 0 points for a loss). If tied on points, tiebreakers were applied in the following order (Regulations Article 20):
Goal difference;
Goals scored;
Head-to-head result in games between tied teams;
Red cards;
Yellow cards;
Drawing of lots.

The winners of each group and the best runner-up among all groups advanced to the semi-finals.

All times local, PYST (UTC−3).

Group A

Group B

Group C

Ranking of group runners-up

Knockout stage
The semi-final matchups were:
Group A winners vs. Group C winners
Group B winners vs. Best runners-up
The semi-final winners and losers played in the final and third place match respectively. If tied after full-time, extra time would not be played, and a penalty shoot-out would be used to determine the winner (Regulations Article 22).

Bracket

Semi-finals

Third place match

Final

References

External links
CONMEBOL Libertadores Sub 20 Paraguay 2020, CONMEBOL.com

2020
U-20
2020 in youth association football
2020 in South American football
International club association football competitions hosted by Paraguay
February 2020 sports events in South America
March 2020 sports events in South America
C